Aggie Beynon  is a Canadian metalsmith based in Waterloo, Ontario. She is noted for her technique of compressing metal powder to create jewellery.

Benyon graduated from the University of Waterloo in 1975. She developed a patented process for Powder metallurgy. She co-owns the Harbinger Gallery in Waterloo, Ontario and was inducted into the Royal Canadian Academy of Arts in 2007.

Exhibitions 

 "Aggie Beynon, Wabi: Imperfect Beauty" Robert Langen Gallery, Waterloo, Ontario, March 30-April 30, 2005
 "Canadian National Exhibition" Toronto, Canada, August 13-September 1, 1986

References

Canadian women artists
Living people
Canadian metalsmiths
Members of the Royal Canadian Academy of Arts
Women metalsmiths
Year of birth missing (living people)